Josiah Johnson, Sr., (January 17, 1795December 4, 1871) was a 19th-century American New York Sandy Hook maritime pilot. He was one of the oldest and well known of the New York Sandy Hook pilots having served for over a half a century as a pilot, builder, and owner of many pilot boats. He was a Privateer in the War of 1812 and was a captive in the Dartmoor Prison. Johnson was owner of the pilot boats Charles H. Marshall, Christian Bergh, and Josiah Johnson. He died on December 1, 1871, in Brooklyn, New York.

Early life 

Johnson was born in Northampton County, Virginia on January 17, 1795. He is the son of Josiah Johnson and Eleanor Kip. His parents died when he was nine years old. Johnson moved to New York and did his apprenticeship under a blacksmith. He then enlisted as a cabin boy on a blue-water ship. He married two times. First to Mary Mongomery (ca. 1829) and then to Catherine Elizabeth Conklin (ca. 1838) and had eight children. One of his sons, Captain William B. Johnson, became a Sandy Hook pilot and commanded the Mary and Catherine.

Career 

Johnson was one of the oldest and well known of the New York Sandy Hook pilots having served for over a half a century as a pilot, builder, and owner of many pilot boats. He enlisted as a Privateer in the War of 1812 out of New York. He was a captured by the British and sent to the Dartmoor Prison in Princetown, England. Two months after April 1815, when peace had been declared, Johnson returned home to New York safey.

Johnson's brother was Obadiah Johnson, the father to Josiah Johnson, Jr., (1832-1919). In 1843, Johnson came to Brooklyn with his nephew Josiah Johnson, Jr., who followed his uncle in the pilot life and became a Sandy Hook pilot.

Johnson went into piloting. He bought shares in the pilot boats Charles H. Marshall, No. 3, and the Christian Bergh, No. 16. He then built and named for himself the pilot boat Josiah Johnson, No. 23. The Josiah Johnson was struck down by the schooner Wanata off of Barnegat and sank in 1869.

Johnson was noted as a fair-minded man because he treated everyone fairly. "Aw! give 'em a chance," was his favorite motto. An example of this was when he owned the pilot boat named Mary and Catherine, which was named after both of his wives, Mary his first wife and Catherine his second.

On February 17, 1846, the pilot boat Mary Eleanor was run ashore near on Shrewsbury beach but not injured. Captain Johnson thanked the people of Shrewsbury for saving all the property belonging to the boat.

Johnson retired from piloting in 1859 when he was sixty-three years old.

Death 

Johnson died on December 1, 1871, at the age of 76, in Brooklyn, New York. At his death he accumulated a fortune of $100,00. His funeral was his late residence in Brooklyn. He was interred at the Green-Wood Cemetery.

See also

 List of Northeastern U. S. Pilot Boats

References

1871 deaths
Sea captains
People from Brooklyn
Maritime pilotage
1795 births
Burials at Green-Wood Cemetery